The Certificato di Conoscenza della Lingua Italiana (Certificate of Knowledge of Italian Language), or CELI, is an internationally recognized qualification of the Italian language destined for foreigners wanting to validate their relative Italian fluency, offered by the Università per Stranieri di Perugia.  It is accepted as an official qualification notably by the Italian Ministry of Education and Research and the Italian Ministry of Foreign Affairs.  It is one of the qualifications used by foreigners to get entrance into any Italian university or higher education institution.

The CELI qualification represents one of the many Italian Language Examinations and is often taken by applicants with immigration, work and study needs or for pure passion.

Origins 
First introduced in 1987, the CELI qualification has been designed to offer high quality in Italian Language Examinations, coming from a university with a history from 1921 of offering Italian language and culture studies to foreign students.  Thus, the Università per Stranieri di Perugia is responsible for its creation, distribution, evaluation and awarding.

Qualification levels 
 CELI UNO The first level examination tests basic Italian skills.  A pass or fail are the results given once evaluation of the completed exam is finished.
 CELI DUE The second level increases in difficulty from the first examination.  Each component is weighted with 25 percent of the total marks and A, B and C (for pass) or D and E (for fail) grades are given upon evaluation.
 CELI TRE The third level examination continues increasing in the difficulty of the Italian involved.  Components take up unequal percentages of the total result with speaking carrying 30 percent, writing sharing 20 percent each with listening and reading accompanied by the 'structural competence' component.  Grades from A to E are also awarded.

Qualification eligibility 
The Qualification is open to all foreign applicants wishing to validate their abilities in Italian language once registered.

Procedure 
An applicant wishing to obtain the CELI qualification must register and pay (prices varying) to sit the examination that seems suitable for them, at least two months before the official sitting of the exam.  When an applicant has completed the exam (registering and sitting can be done through various streams leading to the university), the Università per Stranieri di Perugia evaluates according to European Union guidelines and awards the official qualification, on average, three months after its sitting.  Candidates who receive the qualification do so through successfully passing one of the examinations.  The exams are held multiple times annually around the world.

Many organisations throughout the world offer preparation courses and studies for the exams so candidates can be familiar with what is required.

See also 
 CILS (Qualification)
 PLIDA

External links 
  

Italian language tests